Willa Fitzgerald (born January 17, 1991) is an American actress. She is known for her starring role as Emma Duval in MTV's Scream. She has played cheer coach Colette French in the USA Network's television drama series Dare Me and officer Roscoe Conklin in the Amazon Prime Video television series Reacher. Her other notable roles include Amazon Studios' television series Alpha House and the USA Network's drama series Royal Pains.

Life and career
After first studying psychology for three years, Fitzgerald earned her Bachelor's Degree in Theater Studies from Yale University.

Between 2013 and 2014, Fitzgerald played the role of Lola Laffer in the Amazon Studios political web television series Alpha House. The series lasted two seasons before being cancelled. On April 23, 2014, it was reported that Fitzgerald obtained a recurring role in USA Network's drama series Royal Pains as Emma Miller. Between 2014 and 2015, she also obtained guest-starring roles in various television series such as Blue Bloods, The Following and Gotham.

On August 5, 2014, Fitzgerald was cast in MTV's Scream. On July 29, 2015, the series was renewed for a second season that premiered on May 30, 2016. On April 26, 2017, MTV announced that Scream would undergo a reboot featuring a new cast.

Fitzgerald's credits in theater include works such as Couple in the Kitchen, The Private Sector, Cow Play and The Cat and the Canary. In August 2016, she joined the cast of the film Misfortune, directed by Lucky McKee and released in October 2017 under the title Blood Money.

In January 2016, she was cast in the go90 web series Relationship Status. She portrayed the role of Beth in a two-episode arc.

In March 2017, Fitzgerald was cast in a starring role in the Fox television pilot Behind Enemy Lines, playing Navy pilot Roxanne Daly, though Fox passed on the pilot in May 2017. In July 2017, Fitzgerald was cast to play Meg in the BBC miniseries Little Women based on Louisa May Alcott's novel of the same name. It premiered on Boxing Day, 2017.

In November 2017, Fitzgerald was cast as the lead of E!s pilot #Fashionvictim as Anya St. Clair. In March 2018, the pilot was not commissioned to go forward with E!.<ref>{{cite web |url=https://deadline.com/2018/03/e-juicy-stories-pilot-michael-patrick-king-amy-harris-juicy-couture-founders-fashionvictim-dead-1202346440/ |first=Nellie |last=Andreeva |title=E! Picks Up 'Juicy Stories' Dramedy From Michael Patrick King, Amy Harris & Juicy Couture Founders To Pilot, '#Fashionvictims Dead |website=Deadline Hollywood |date=March 20, 2018 |access-date=August 3, 2018}}</ref> In December 2017, she was cast to play Kitsey Barbour in The Goldfinch based on Donna Tartt's Pulitzer Prize-winning book of the same name, which was released on September 13, 2019.

In July 2018, Fitzgerald was cast as one of the lead roles in the USA Network drama pilot Dare Me, which was picked up to series in January 2019. On April 30, 2020, the series was canceled after one season. In December 2018, Fitzgerald was cast in an episode of the Netflix anthology drama series, Heartstrings. The series premiered on November 22, 2019. In April 2019, it was announced that Fitzgerald would guest star in the sixth season of the TV Land comedy-drama series Younger.

In March 2021, Fitzgerald was cast as officer Roscoe Conklin in the first season of the Amazon Prime Video series Reacher, which premiered in February 2022. In June 2022, she was announced to star in Steven Brand's noir thriller Joe Baby''.

Filmography

References

External links

Living people
1991 births
21st-century American actresses
Actresses from Nashville, Tennessee
American stage actresses
American television actresses
Yale University alumni